is a videogame developed and published for the Nintendo Wii based upon the manga and anime series Crayon Shin-chan. The game was released in Spain on April 25, 2008, by 505 Games as Shin Chan: Las Nuevas Aventuras para Wii. This game was a launch title for the Wii in Japan and Spain only.

The game consists of a series of mini-games integrated into the world of Shin-chan.

External links
Official site

References

2006 video games
Banpresto games
Japan-exclusive video games
Video games developed in Japan
Wii-only games
Wii games
Video games based on anime and manga
Crayon Shin-chan